John Campbell (21 December 1865–?) was an Irish barrister and Healyite Nationalist Member of Parliament (MP) for South Armagh from 1900 – 1906.

Early life & political career 
Campbell was born in Blackwatertown, County Armagh, the only child of schoolteacher Daniel (c.1830-1902), and Mary Campbell. In the 1890s he studied at the Royal University of Ireland, and he was called to the bar by the Middle Temple in January 1896.

In October 1900, Campbell stood as one of sixteen Healyite Nationalist candidates, and contested the seat of South Armagh, which had been vacant since the death of Edward McHugh in August. He subsequently defeated the Irish Parliamentary candidate, Charles O'Neill, who would later win the seat in a by-election in 1909. During his time in parliament he frequently spoke on behalf of the Board of National Education, and on local affairs, particularly the running of the Armagh workhouse and post office.

Campbell did not stand for re-election in 1906, citing dissatisfaction with parliamentary life, and William McKillop was subsequently returned unopposed for the Irish Parliamentary Party.

Later career 
Little else is currently known about Campbell after his decision to stand down as an MP. He was a lifelong bachelor, and had no children. In June 1910 he was injured after being struck by a taxicab on Charing Cross Road in London. His last known mention in print was his attendance of a wedding in Fulham in November 1926.

References

External Links 

1870 births
Year of death unknown
Place of birth missing
Members of the Parliament of the United Kingdom for County Armagh constituencies (1801–1922)
UK MPs 1900–1906
Healyite Nationalist MPs